Hydra oligactis, also known as the brown hydra, is a species of hydra found widely dispersed in the northern temperate zone. It is a common organism found in still waters from early Spring to late Autumn.

It is  commonly found attached to the stems of water plants, the undersides of leaves, submerged twigs and on the surface of stones. When disturbed it retracts to a small brown blob which is easily overlooked. Gently sweeping through a clean weedy pond and allowing the collected water and leaves to stand in a jar will often reveal Hydra emerging after only a few minutes.

When in feeding mode, the fully extended tentacles are very long and may exceed  in length. In this condition the tentacles are very difficult to see with the naked eye and are often only revealed when a prey animal such as Daphnia is caught. The  relative length of the tentacles compared to the body is characteristic of the species and serves to differentiate it from any other brown Hydra of cool temperate waters.

When a cold sensitive strain of H. oligactis is subjected to temperature stress, it undergoes a shift from asexual budding to sexual reproduction.  This shift involves an upregulation of genes involved in gametogenesis, cellular senescence, apoptosis and DNA repair, and a downregulation of genes involved in stem cell maintenance.

Hydra oligactis is preyed upon by the flatworm Microstomum lineare, which incorporates Hydra stenoteles into its own epidermis.

References

Hydridae
Animals described in 1766
Taxa named by Peter Simon Pallas